Balin Cupples (born 21 July 1981) is a former professional rugby league footballer who played for the Wests Tigers.

Cupples made his NRL debut for the Wests Tigers in round 9 of 2002, playing from the bench. In round 13, he made his first appearance in the starting team, playing on the wing. Making one appearance, his last, in 2003, Cupples had played four games in first-grade, all losses.

Returning to the Queensland Cup, Cupples played with the Burleigh Bears, and was a member of the Queensland Residents team in 2005.

Cupples became a coach after his playing retirement. In 2011 he was coach of the Wests Tigers SG Ball side, and in 2012 was the NYC team's strength and conditioning coach. In 2013, he was the assistant coach for the New South Wales Under-18 team that defeated Queensland 56–6.

Footnotes

References

External links
RLP Profile

Australian rugby league players
Wests Tigers players
Living people
1981 births
Place of birth missing (living people)